Aphaniotis is a genus of agamid lizards from Southeast Asia.

Species
There are three species in genus Aphaniotis:

References

Aphaniotis
Reptiles of Southeast Asia
Lizard genera
Taxa named by Wilhelm Peters